Whimple railway station serves the village of Whimple in east Devon, England. It is operated by South Western Railway which provides services on the West of England Main Line.

History

The station was situated to the east of the village and designed by the architect Sir William Tite. The main building was situated on the up platform and was two-storeys high to provide the station master with accommodation. The goods shed was nearby at the east end of the station, and a signal box was built opposite on the other platform in 1875. In 1892 Henry Whiteway established a cider factory on the north side of the station. This generated much of the goods traffic at the station; in the 1930s it was estimated that the factory was responsible for 30,000 tons of traffic each year.

On 11 June 1967 all passenger trains were diverted to the down platform. The track through the northern platform was retained to serve Whiteway’s factory, but the signal box was closed and the train crew operated the points. Public goods traffic was withdrawn on 4 December 1967 but Whiteways continued to handle rail traffic. The station became unstaffed on 5 October 1970.

The Whiteways factory closed in 1989 and this allowed a redevelopment of the site. The goods shed was demolished in 1991 and houses were then built instead. The following year the original London bound platform was extended across the disused formation of the London bound track to meet the running line and was brought back into use. The other platform and the footbridge were then demolished.

Facilities
The single platform has a simple metal and glass waiting shelter, as well as a ticket machine, a help point and bike racks..

Services

All services at Whimple are operated by South Western Railway using  and  DMUs.

Due to the short platform at this station, passengers wishing to alight need to be in the front 3 coaches of the train as the platform can only take 3-car trains.

See also
 Southern Railway routes west of Salisbury

References

External links

Railway stations in Devon
Former London and South Western Railway stations
Railway stations in Great Britain opened in 1860
Railway stations served by South Western Railway
William Tite railway stations
DfT Category F2 stations